Steven Gerald Clifford (born September 17, 1961) is an American basketball coach who is the head coach of the Charlotte Hornets of the National Basketball Association (NBA). He previously served as the head coach of the Orlando Magic.

Early life
Born in Island Falls, Maine, Clifford grew up in Mattawamkeag, Maine, until the third grade, when he moved to Vermont. He played varsity basketball under Gerald Clifford, his father and head coach at North Country Union High School in Newport, Vermont.

Clifford attended the University of Maine at Farmington, where he played college basketball for four years. In his final two seasons, he was team captain and was named Best Defensive Player. He graduated with a degree in special education.

Coaching career
After graduating from college, Clifford became a teacher at Woodland High School in Maine. He also gained his first coaching experience at the school, serving as their head coach for two seasons while leading them to two tournaments. He then served as an assistant coach at St. Anselm College, Fairfield University, Boston University and Siena College. In 1995, he assumed the head coaching duties at Adelphi University and coached for four seasons leading his team to four appearances in the NCAA Division II Tournament, an 86–36 (.705) record and four consecutive 20-win seasons. He was the first coach in the school's history with back-to-back 20-plus win seasons.

Clifford became an NBA assistant coach with the New York Knicks and Houston Rockets under Jeff Van Gundy and quickly developed a reputation as a defensive expert. He then was an assistant for Stan Van Gundy with the Orlando Magic. He considers both the Van Gundy brothers as mentors.  He reached the NBA Playoffs in each of his five seasons with Orlando, appearing in the NBA Finals in 2009.

Clifford then joined the Los Angeles Lakers in 2012–13 as an assistant.

Charlotte Bobcats/Hornets
On May 29, 2013, Clifford was hired by the Charlotte Bobcats to be their head coach.

Clifford implemented a defensive mentality in Charlotte during his first year as head coach turning the Charlotte Bobcats into a top five defensive team when in the years prior to his tenure they ranked near the bottom of the NBA in that category. He led the Bobcats to the 2014 NBA playoffs in his first year as head coach, during which he coached the Bobcats to a 43–39 record. The two years prior to him joining the Bobcats only had a combined total of 28 wins. He was named Eastern Conference Coach of the Month for April 2014 after he led the Bobcats to a 7–1 record leading to the playoffs. He finished fourth in Coach of the Year voting in his first year. On December 6, 2017, it was announced that Clifford would not coach indefinitely to deal with his health issue. On January 11, 2018, the Hornets announced that Clifford was medically cleared to return to coaching after a 21-game absence after dealing with sleep deprivation. After the 2017–18 regular season, he was fired as head coach on April 13, 2018, after five seasons coaching the team to a 196–214 record total.

Orlando Magic
On May 30, 2018, Clifford was named the head coach of the Orlando Magic.

The Magic started the 2018–19 season by splitting their first 24 games before falling 11 games under .500 after a 126–117 loss to the Oklahoma City Thunder. Despite the dismal start, Clifford led the Magic on a dramatic turnaround. On April 7, 2019, Orlando defeated the Boston Celtics 116–108 to clinch their first playoff berth since the 2011–12 season. The win also clinched the Magic's first Southeast Division title since the 2009–10 season. This was the Magic's first playoff appearance since trading Dwight Howard to the Los Angeles Lakers in 2012, ending the longest playoff drought in franchise history.

On June 5, 2021, Clifford and the Magic decided to part ways.

Charlotte Hornets (second stint)
After the 2021–22 NBA season concluded, the Hornets re-hired Clifford as their head coach on June 24, 2022.

Head coaching record

College

NBA

|-
| style="text-align:left;"|Charlotte
| style="text-align:left;"|
| 82||43||39|||| align="center"|3rd in Southeast|||4||0||4||
| style="text-align:center;"|Lost in First Round
|-
| style="text-align:left;"|Charlotte
| style="text-align:left;"|
| 82||33||49|||| align="center"|4th in Southeast|||—||—||—||—
| style="text-align:center;"|Missed playoffs
|-
| style="text-align:left;"|Charlotte
| style="text-align:left;"|
| 82||48||34|||| align="center"|3rd in Southeast|||7||3||4||
| style="text-align:center;"|Lost in First Round
|-
| style="text-align:left;"|Charlotte
| style="text-align:left;"|
| 82||36||46|||| align="center"|4th in Southeast|||—||—||—||—
| style="text-align:center;"|Missed playoffs
|-
| style="text-align:left;"|Charlotte
| style="text-align:left;"|
| 82||36||46|||| align="center"|3rd in Southeast|||—||—||—||—
| style="text-align:center;"|Missed playoffs
|-
| style="text-align:left;"|Orlando
| style="text-align:left;"|
| 82||42||40|||| align="center"|1st in Southeast||5||1||4||
| style="text-align:center;"|Lost in First Round
|-
| style="text-align:left;"|Orlando
| style="text-align:left;"|
| 73||33||40|||| align="center"|2nd in Southeast||5||1||4||
| style="text-align:center;"|Lost in First Round
|-
| style="text-align:left;"|Orlando
| style="text-align:left;"|
| 72||21||51|||| align="center"|5th in Southeast||—||—||—||—
| style="text-align:center;"|Missed playoffs
|-class="sortbottom"
| style="text-align:center;" colspan="2"|Career||637||292||345|||| ||21||5||16||||

See also

References

External links
 Profile at NBA.com

1961 births
Living people
Adelphi Panthers men's basketball coaches
American basketball scouts
American men's basketball coaches
American men's basketball players
Basketball coaches from Maine
Basketball coaches from Vermont
Boston University Terriers men's basketball coaches
Charlotte Bobcats head coaches
Charlotte Hornets head coaches
College men's basketball head coaches in the United States
College men's basketball players in the United States
East Carolina Pirates men's basketball coaches
Fairfield Stags men's basketball coaches
High school basketball coaches in Maine
Houston Rockets assistant coaches
Los Angeles Lakers assistant coaches
New York Knicks assistant coaches
New York Knicks scouts
Orlando Magic assistant coaches
Orlando Magic head coaches
People from Aroostook County, Maine
People from Derby, Vermont
People from Penobscot County, Maine
Siena Saints men's basketball coaches
University of Maine at Farmington alumni